Havat Skali, also known as Point 792, is an illegal Israeli outpost in the West Bank. Located around four kilometres south-east of Elon Moreh, it falls under the jurisdiction of Shomron Regional Council. The international community considers Israeli settlements in the West Bank illegal under international law, but the Israeli government disputes this.

History
The outpost was established by Yitzhak Skali in 1999, and is home to around 20 people. It was slated to be evacuated in mid-2006, pending a government decision to remove dozens of such outposts. Later that year it was included in a list drawn up by Kadima MK Otniel Schneller of outposts to be legalised.

References

See also
At Skali's Farm, they blame the media for militant image, Nadav Shragai, June 5, 2006, Haaretz

Israeli settlements in the West Bank
Populated places established in 1999
1999 establishments in the Palestinian territories
Israeli outposts